Nadine Dana Suesse (December 3, 1911 – October 16, 1987) was an American musician, composer and lyricist.

Biography
Dana Suesse was born in Kansas City, Missouri in 1909. When she grew too tall for ballet, she began piano lessons with Gertrude Concannon. While still a child, Suesse toured the Midwest vaudeville circuits in an act centered on dancing and piano playing. During the recital, she would ask the audience for a theme, and then weaving it into something of her own. In 1926, she and her mother moved to New York City.

Suesse began to create larger-scale pieces from which she would extrapolate a phrase and then set that tune to words, collaborating with a lyricist. "My Silent Love" (which came from a larger piece called "Jazz Nocturne"), and "You Oughta Be in Pictures" are among her most well-known and popular hits. She collaborated with lyricist Eddie Heyman on "You Ought to Be in Pictures" in addition to other hits, including "Ho-Hum." The 1930s press called Suesse "the girl Gershwin." Fortune, a magazine then devoted to male achievement, included her photo alongside eight other veterans of the music business, with the headline, "Nine Assets of a Prosperous Organization" (January 1933).

While in New York, Suesse studied piano under Alexander Siloti, Franz Liszt's last surviving pupil. She studied composition under Rubin Goldmark, one of George Gershwin's teachers, and spent three years studying with Nadia Boulanger after World War II.  In 1931, bandleader Paul Whiteman (following Gershwin's Rhapsody in Blue) commissioned her to write "Concerto in Three Rhythms."

In early 1932, she recorded a piano roll of the Sammy Fain and Irving Kahal popular tune "Was That The Human Thing To Do" for the Aeolian Company's Duo-Art reproducing piano system.  Beginning in 1930, Suesse formed a songwriting partnership with impresario Billy Rose (usually in collaboration with other lyricists) that lasted into the 1940s. 

In 1936 Suesse lived in Fort Worth, Texas for three months to compose the score for Rose's Casa Mañana, the spectacular outdoor dinner theatre of the Fort Worth (Texas) Frontier Centennial.  With Rose and Irving Kahal she composed "The Night Is Young And You're So Beautiful," which won a fifth place on Your Hit Parade on the broadcast of February 6, 1937, and stayed on the program for six weeks.  The Jan Garber, George Hall and Wayne King orchestras all recorded it in 1937, and in 1951 Ray Anthony's orchestra made it a hit again.  On June 13, 1937 Amon G. Carter arranged for Billy Rose and Suesse to attend a dinner at the White House as guests of President and Mrs. Franklin D. Roosevelt.  After dinner, music from Casa Mañana was performed by one of the show's stars, Everett Marshall.

Subsequently, she wrote many songs with Rose, including "Yours For A Song" (in collaboration with lyricist Ted Fetter), the theme of Billy Rose's Aquacade of the 1939 New York World's Fair. In the 1940s Suesse was Rose's staff composer for his legendary Diamond Horseshoe Revues. With lyricist E.Y. "Yip" Harburg Suesse wrote "Moon About Town" (for Jane Froman in the Ziegfeld Follies of 1934) and "Missouri Misery", both published in 1934.

After her success in writing popular songs (other lyricists included Harold Adamson, Sam Coslow) Suesse moved to Paris for three years to study composition with Nadia Boulanger. Boulanger accepted Suesse as a student on the recommendation of the great orchestrator, and Suesse's tennis partner, Robert Russell Bennett.

On December 11, 1974, Suesse and her husband produced a symphony concert at Carnegie Hall, devoted exclusively to her compositions. (In the 1990s, Robert Stern produced a CD of the concert using masters from Voice Of America.) On July 31, 1975, the Newport Music Festival (Rhode Island) presented four of her works in their concert series. A year after the Carnegie Hall concert, Suesse and her husband moved to the U.S. Virgin Islands.

After her husband's death in 1981, Suesse moved back to New York, the city where she had spent her most creative years. She took two apartments in the Gramercy Park Hotel and continued to write plays and songs for the theatre. Just before her death from a stroke on October 16, 1987, she was writing a new musical, putting the finishing touches on Mr. Sycamore, which had been optioned for off-Broadway, and was looking for a New York home for a straight play, Nemesis.

On September 24, 2003, John McGlinn conducted the BBC Concert Orchestra (UK) in a performance of American music that included three compositions by Suesse.  Among the original productions for which Suesse composed are Sweet And Low (1930), You Never Know (1938), Crazy With the Heat (1941), and incidental music for both The Seven Year Itch (1952) and The Golden Fleecing (1959).

Chronology

Works
Dana Suesse's output includes many popular songs, short jazzy piano pieces, film scores and Broadway show tunes. Only her "serious" classical compositions are listed below.

 Syncopated Love Song for piano (1928); version for jazz orchestra with piano obbligato premiered on December 13, 1929 by Nathaniel Shilkret conducting the Victor Orchestra; in 1931 the main melody became a hit song under the title Have You Forgotten, with lyrics by Leo Robin
 Jazz Nocturne for piano (1931); also arranged for piano and orchestra by Carroll Huxley; the second theme became a popular hit as a song under the title "My Silent Love"
 Concerto in Three Rhythms for piano and orchestra (1932); commissioned by Paul Whiteman for his Fourth "Experiment in Modern Music" concert (Carnegie Hall, November 4, 1932) and orchestrated by Whiteman's chief arranger Ferde Grofé; later re-orchestrated by Dana Suesse herself without the constraints of the Paul Whiteman orchestra and premiered in 1974
 Symphonic Waltzes for piano and orchestra (1933); sometimes referred to as Jazz Waltzes or Eight Waltzes, although the eight sections are played without break and form a work in one continuous movement
 Danza a Media Noche for two pianos (1933)
 Blue Moonlight for orchestra with piano obbligato (1934); premiered during Paul Whiteman's Kraft Music Hall broadcast of October 11, 1934; also arranged for solo piano
 "Love Makes the World Go Round," song copyrighted in 1935, music by Dana Suesse, words by Edward Heyman from the 1935 film, Sweet Surrender
 Afternoon of a Black Faun for orchestra with piano obbligato (1936); originally entitled Evening in Harlem and retitled for publication in 1938; orchestration by Adolph Deutsch
 Young Man With a Harp, suite for harp and orchestra (1939); written for harpist Casper Reardon; also arranged by Dana Suesse for harp, piano and percussion and recorded in this form by Casper Reardon, Dana Suesse and Chauncey Morehouse (New York, April 12, 1940)
 Concerto for two pianos and orchestra in E minor (1934–1941)
 American Nocturne for orchestra with piano obbligato (1941); recorded by Meredith Willson And His Concert Orchestra as part of the 1941 LP "Modern American Music"; also arranged for solo piano
 Three Compositions for the Piano (At the Fountain; Midnight in Gramercy Square; Swamp-bird) (1941)
 110th Street Rhumba for piano (1941); later orchestrated by Dana Suesse and premiered in this form during the Newport Music Festival, 1975
 Coronach for harp and orchestra (1941); dedicated to the memory of Casper Reardon, for whom she had composed her suite Young Man With a Harp two years before; broadcast on December 19, 1941
 Cocktail Suite for piano (1942); also orchestrated
 Three Cities Suite for symphony orchestra (1943)
 Concertino for piano and orchestra (published by E. H. Morris, 1945)
 Concerto Romantico for piano and orchestra in A major (1946)
 Night Sky for piano or for orchestra (1946); orchestral version premiered by Paul Whiteman and his Concert Orchestra on a Philco radio broadcast, 1946
 Jazz Concerto in D major for solo piano, combo and orchestra (1955); originally entitled Concerto in Rhythm but retitled in order to avoid confusion with her earlier 1932 Concerto in Three Rhythms; also arranged for two pianos and recorded in this form by Dana Suesse and Cy Coleman in 1956
 Scherzette/Whirligig for piano; later orchestrated by Dana Suesse (score published in 1956)

Selected filmography and audio 

  (1933 film short), Paramount; 
  (1931), 1940 recording performed by Dana Suesse
  (1933), 1935 recording by Dana Suesse with the General Motors Symphony Orchestra conducted by Frank Black in Studio 8H
  (1934), recording by Paul Whiteman and his Concert Orchestra with Dana Suesse at the piano, recorded December 14, 1934, in New York
  (1934–1941), Beatrice Long and Christina Long, pianos; Eskişehir Greater Municipality Symphony Orchestra conducted by Patrick Souillot
  (1932), Michael Gurt, piano, Hot Springs Music Festival Symphony Orchestra conducted by Richard Rosenberg
  (1941), recording performed by Dana Suesse
  (1946), recording of the world premiere (Cooper Union concert, Dana Suesse and the New York Symphony of The Air conducted by David Broekman (1899–1958) (fr), March 27, 1955
  (1946), performance by Kayla Wong
  (1955), Cy Coleman,  piano, American Symphony Orchestra, Frederick Fennell, conductor, recorded live, Carnegie Hall, December 11, 1974
 , Dana Suesse, piano

Family 
Dana Suesse, on July 26, 1940, in Fauquier County, Virginia, married -year-old Courtney Burr (né Howard Courtney Burr; 1891–1961), his second marriage. They divorced June 29, 1954. Suesse, on April 16, 1971, married businessman Charles Edwin Delinks (1912–1981), with whom she remained married until his death.  Dana's father, Julius C. Suess (1877–1942) died January 16, 1942, in Chicago. Her mother, Nina (née Dina Louise Quarrier; 1886–1975) and father were divorced.  Nina, around 1930, married Robert Chave Stevens (1896–1959). Nina died February 15, 1975, in Niantic, Connecticut.

References

External links

Dana Suesse Papers at the Library of Congress

1911 births
1987 deaths
American women composers
Musicians from Shreveport, Louisiana
Vaudeville performers
20th-century American composers
20th-century American women musicians
Broadway composers and lyricists
20th-century women composers